The Zorawar is an Indian tank. It is a cross between an armoured fighting vehicle and an Indian light tank (AFV-ILT), with a high power-to-weight ratio and substantial firepower, protection, surveillance and communication capabilities. It was designed to provide the Indian Army with the versatility to execute operations in varying terrain against diverse threats and equipment profiles of its adversaries.

Light tanks in the Indian Army 
Light tanks have got renewed focus and interest in recent times, primarily due to flaring security situations in remote and inaccessible areas (2020-2022 India China skirmishes). In the extreme high altitudes of Ladakh, it is very difficult to operate medium tanks, like T-72 and T-90, or heavy/Main Battle Tanks like Arjun Mk1/Arjun Mk2 which were neither built nor equipped to handle the harsh conditions.

Challenges in operating at high altitudes 
There are various challenges in operating at high altitudes. Conventional military platforms like tanks, infantry fighting vehicles (IFV), self propelled artillery etc. are not always able to generate enough power to maneuver due to rarefied air and lack of oxygen, or, face other logistical and operational challenges. This was seen in US invasion of Afghanistan, Operation Meghdoot, India Pakistan Siachen Conflict, Kargil War, and now again with Galwan Conflict.

Background for light tank requirement 
Deploying such platforms in extreme altitudes require special modifications, special types of fuel, etc. which further puts stress on the logistics of the sector. In fact, the K9 Vajra self propelled howitzers that India deployed in Ladakh and Leh in response to Chinese incursions and aggressions  had to be specially modified, so that they could function properly in the high altitudes.

Also, the Indian Army found out, that the Chinese side had deployed Type 15 tank, which had significant advantage over the assets Indian Army was fielding at the extreme heights of Galwan valley.

Development 
This project of Light Tanks has been named after General Zorawar Singh Kahluria, who led 1841 Military Expedition to Kailash Mansrovar during Sino-Sikh War. After news of deployment of ZTZ-04A Chinese Light Tanks at Ladakh sector,Indian Army wanted to operate light tanks in Himalayan theatres, where they will be easy to operate, maintain, light and maneuverable without sacrificing firepower. Initially, Indian Army intended to procure these light tanks from Russia. Army has finalised the general staff quality requirements and will approach the Ministry of Defence in September 2022 for the Acceptance of Necessity (AON) 

The project, which has already received in-principle approval, is planned to be procured under the ‘Make-I’ acquisition category of the Defense Acquisition Procedure (DAP)-2020, in line with the ‘Make in India’ initiative.

On 16 September 2022, it was confirmed that L&T has been selected as the development partner of this homegrown "mountain tank" which is to be rolled out by 2023.

Proposed design 
The new light tank is supposed to be a light and maneuverable without sacrificing firepower. Its capabilities will also be supplemented by Artificial Intelligence, integration with swarm drones for higher situational awareness, loitering ammunition for high lethality and active protection system as a shield against modern anti-armour systems.

See also
 K21
 M8 Armored Gun System
 General Dynamics Griffin
 Mobile Protected Firepower
 2S25 Sprut-SD
 Sabrah Light Tank
 Combat Vehicle 90
 WPB Anders
 Tanque Argentino Mediano
 Future Combat Systems Manned Ground Vehicles
 Type 15 tank
 Type 62

References 

Light tanks of India
Airborne tanks
Fire support vehicles
Post–Cold War light tanks